Eric T. Washington (born December 2, 1953) is a Senior associate judge of the District of Columbia Court of Appeals. He was appointed to the D.C. Court of Appeals in 1999 by President Bill Clinton and served as chief judge from August 6, 2005, to March 18, 2017.

Early life and education
Washington was born and raised in New Jersey. He graduated in 1976 from Tufts University and received his law degree from the Columbia University School of Law in 1979.

Career
In 1979, Washington began his legal career with the law firm of Fulbright & Jaworski in Houston, Texas, where he engaged in a general labor and employment practice prior to relocating to Washington, D.C. to serve as Legislative Director and Counsel to U.S. Congressman Michael A. Andrews of Texas. He subsequently rejoined Fulbright & Jaworski in Washington, D.C. prior to serving as Special Counsel to the Corporation Counsel (now Attorney General for the District of Columbia) and later as Principal Deputy Corporation Counsel between 1987 and 1989.  From January 1990 to May 1995, Washington was a partner in the law firm of Hogan & Hartson, which concluded with his 1995 appointment to the Superior Court of the District of Columbia. As an associate judge in the Superior Court, he presided over various criminal trials as well as cases from the Drug Court, Domestic Violence Unit, tax and probate matters on certification from other judges, and cases involving children who were victims of abuse and neglect.

Washington previously served as co-chair of the Strategic Planning Leadership Council for the District of Columbia Courts and as a member of the Standing Committee on Fairness and Access to the Courts, as well as the Access to Justice Commission.

Washington has served on several committees of the D.C. Bar, including the Criminal Justice Act/Counsel for Child Abuse and Neglect Committee, the Standing Committee on the Federal Judiciary, and the Bar’s Nominating Committee. He also served as a member of the Steering Committee for the D.C. Affairs Sections of the Bar.

Washington serves on the Board of Directors for the Boys and Girls Clubs of Greater Washington and the Board of Directors for the Boys and Girls Clubs Foundation. He formerly served on the Board of Directors for the Einstein Institute for Science, Health and the Courts and currently serves as chair of the Board of Directors of the Advanced Science and Technology Adjudication Standards, Credential and Accreditation Board.

References

External links

Information on Chief Judge Washington

|-

1953 births
Living people
20th-century American judges
21st-century American judges
African-American judges
Columbia Law School alumni
Judges of the District of Columbia Court of Appeals
Judges of the Superior Court of the District of Columbia
People from Jersey City, New Jersey
Tufts University alumni
20th-century African-American people
21st-century African-American people